The following is a list of notable deaths in April 1991.

Entries for each day are listed alphabetically by surname. A typical entry lists information in the following sequence:
 Name, age, country of citizenship at birth, subsequent country of citizenship (if applicable), reason for notability, cause of death (if known), and reference.

April 1991

1
Angus Cameron, 61, Scottish rugby player.
Jon Eardley, 62, American trumpeter.
Martha Graham, 96, American dancer and choreographer, pneumonia.
Frankie Gustine, 71, American baseball player.
Jaime Guzmán, 44, Chilean politician, shot.
George Lee, 71, English footballer.
Eddie Miller, 79, American jazz musician, pneumonia.
Paulo Muwanga, 66, Ugandan politician, president (1980).
Bjarne Nerem, 67, Norwegian jazz musician.
Detlev Karsten Rohwedder, 58, German politician, shot.
Rina Zelyonaya, 89, Soviet actress, singer and comedian, cancer.

2
Noel George Butlin, 69, Australian economic historian.
Gisa Geert, 90, Austrian actress and choreographer.
Ken Gunning, 76, American basketball player.
Cheng Shewo, 92, Chinese journalist, publisher, and educator.
Robert Veyron-Lacroix, 68, French harpsichordist and pianist.

3
P. K. Balakrishnan, 66, Indian novelist.
Fred Capossela, 88, American horse racing announcer, stroke.
Charles Goren, 90, American bridge player.
Graham Greene, 86, English writer, leukemia.
John Mullen, 66, American Major League Baseball executive.
Coral Lansbury, 61, Australian writer, bowel cancer.
Alan Stewart Orr, 80, British barrister.
Jo Teunissen-Waalboer, 71, Dutch Olympic javelin thrower (1948).

4
Edmund Adamkiewicz, 70, German football player.
Max Frisch, 79, Swiss playwright and novelist, colorectal cancer.
Louis Guglielmi, 75, French composer.
John Heinz, 52, American politician, member of the U.S. House of Representatives (1971–1977) and Senate (since 1977), plane crash.
Graham Ingels, 75, American comic artist.
Johnny Moore, 89, American baseball player.
The Thinker, 12, British thoroughbred racehorse, euthanized.

5
Nona Balakian, 72, American literary critic and an editor.
Gerald Blake, 62, British television director.
Sonny Carter, 43, American astronaut, plane crash.
William Sidney, 1st Viscount De L'Isle, 81, English-Australian politician, Governor-General of Australia (1961–1965).
Eve Garnett, 91, English writer.
Kōzō Masuda, 73, Japanese professional shogi player.
Jiří Mucha, 76, Czechoslovak journalist, cancer.
John Tower, 65, American politician, member of the U.S. Senate (1961–1985), plane crash.
Renato Turi, 70, Italian actor and voice actor.

6
Ed Craney, 86, American radio executive.
Dennis Cross, 66, American actor, cancer.
Louis Joxe, 89, French politician.
Joaquín Nogueras Márquez, 84, Spanish Olympic equestrian (1948, 1952, 1956).
Bill Ponsford, 90, Australian cricketer.

7
Cora DuBois, 87, American anthropologist, pneumonia.
Henry Glover, 69, American songwriter, heart attack.
Véra Nabokov, 89, Soviet-Swiss translator.
Ruth Page, 92, American ballerina.

8
Dink Carroll, 91, Canadian sports journalist.
Pierre Grégoire, 83, Luxembourgish politician.
Haim Hanani, 78, Polish-Israeli mathematician.
Max Janowski, 78-79, German-American composer.
Per "Dead" Ohlin, 22, Swedish black metal musician (Mayhem), suicide by gunshot.
Paul Söllner, 79, German Olympic rower (1936).
Kristian Osvald Viderø, 84, Faroese clergyman and translator.
Tilo Freiherr von Berlepsch, 77, German actor.

9
Maurice Binder, 72, American film title designer (James Bond), lung cancer.
Norris Bowden, 64, Canadian figure skater.
Antoine Dignef, 80, Belgian cyclist.
William Mims, 64, American actor, cardiac arrest.
Forrest Towns, 77, American track and field athlete, heart attack.

10
Otto Berg, 84, Norwegian Olympic long jumper (1936).
Kevin Peter Hall, 35, American actor (Predator, Harry and the Hendersons, 227), AIDS.
Marian Kaiser, 58, Polish speedway rider.
Natalie Schafer, 90, American actress (Gilligan's Island), liver cancer.
Paul Stader, 80, American actor and stuntman (The Towering Inferno, The Goonies, The Poseidon Adventure).
Wu Yin, 81, Chinese actress.

11
Chester Anderson, 58, American underground press poet and editor.
Fredson Bowers, 85, American bibliographer.
Walker Cooper, 76, American baseball player.
Doris de Jong, 89, Dutch Olympic fencer (1928, 1932).
Bruno Hoffmann, 77, German glass harpist.
Mikine Kuwahara, 95, Japanese politician.
Dick Manning, 78, Russian-American songwriter.
Bernard Taylor, Baron Taylor of Mansfield, 95, British politician.

12
Gene Lillard, 77, American baseball player.
Tom Rosqui, 62, American actor (The Godfather Part II), cancer.
James Schuyler, 67, American poet, stroke.
Orville Vogel, 83, American scientist and wheat biologist, cancer.
Ivar Waller, 92, Swedish theoretical physicist.

13
Bobby Boriello, 47, American mobster (Gambino crime family), shot.
Serge David, 58, French racing cyclist.
Wilhelm Lanzky-Otto, 82, Danish horn player.
Kalevi Laurila, 53, Finnish Olympic skier (1964, 1968).
Leo Rodak, 77, American featherweight boxer.

14
Dhalia, 66, Indonesian actress, cancer.
Randolfo Pacciardi, 92, Italian politician.
Lionello Levi Sandri, 80, Italian politician.
Yosef Tekoah, 66, Polish-Israeli diplomat, heart attack.

15
Francisco Herrera Luque, 63, Venezuelan writer, psychiatrist and diplomat.
Dante Milano, 91, Brazilian poet.
Teddy Petersen, 98, Danish violinist.
Erich Zander, 86, German Olympic field hockey player (1928, 1936).

16
Qin Benli, 72, Chinese journalist, stomach cancer.
Patrick Bergin, 1990, Irish politician and trade union official.
Homer Bigart, 83, American journalist, cancer.
John V. Breakwell, 74, American control theorist.
Bob Dill, 70, American ice hockey player.
Roman Jasinski, 84, Polish ballet dancer.
David Lean, 83, English film director (Lawrence of Arabia, Doctor Zhivago, The Bridge on the River Kwai), Oscar winner (1958, 1963), esophageal cancer.
Rafton Pounder, 57, Northern Irish unionist politician.

17
Giovanni Malagodi, 86, Italian politician.
Michael Long, 43, Australian actor, lung cancer.
Les Mallon, 85, American baseball player.
Michael Pertwee, 74, English screenwriter.
Tadeusz Pietrzykowski, 74, Polish boxer and Holocaust survivor.
Jack Yellen, 98, Polish-American lyricist ("Happy Days Are Here Again").

18
Ron Bottcher, 50, American opera singer, AIDS.
Gabriel Celaya, 80, Spanish poet.
Thomas Arthur Connolly, 91, American Roman Catholic prelate.
Martin Hannett, 42, English record producer, heart failure.
John Morse Haydon, 71, American politician.
Austin Bradford Hill, 93, English epidemiologist.
Sheldon Jones, 69, American baseball player.
Menios Koutsogiorgas, 68-69, Greek politician.
Barry Rogers, 55, American trombonist.

19
Dilara Aliyeva, 61, Soviet philologist and translator, traffic collision.
Leon Foster, 77, Barbadian cricket player.
Judy Gunn, 76, British actress.
Stanley Hawes, 86, British-Australian filmmaker.
Louise Dickinson Rich, 87, American writer.

20
Hiroyuki Ebihara, 51, Japanese boxer.
Seán Ó Faoláin, 91, Irish writer.
Anton Kotzig, 71, Czechoslovak-Canadian mathematician.
Steve Marriott, 44, English musician (Small Faces, Humble Pie), house fire.
Emmanuel Kiwanuka Nsubuga, 76, Ugandan Roman Catholic cardinal.
Don Siegel, 78, American film director (Dirty Harry, Invasion of the Body Snatchers, Escape from Alcatraz), cancer.
Yumjaagiin Tsedenbal, 74, Mongolian politician, bile duct cancer.
Bucky Walters, 82, American baseball player.

21
Richard Walker Bolling, 74, American politician, member of the U.S. House of Representatives (1949–1983).
Willi Boskovsky, 81, Austrian violinist.
Li Choh-ming, 79, Chinese-American economist and educator.
Bernard Laidebeur, 48, French Olympic runner (1964).
Alexey Vodyagin, 66, Soviet footballer.
Dick Weik, 63, American baseball player.

22
Jack Kid Berg, 81, English boxer.
Andrew Boyle, 71, Scottish journalist and biographer.
Anne Howard, 66, American actress, cerebral hemorrhage.
Karl Klasen, 81, German banker.
Mikheil Meskhi, 54, Georgian football player.
Sylvio Pirillo, 74, Brazilian footballer.
Jason Richard Swallen, 87, American botanist.
Feriha Tevfik, 80-81, Turkish actress, cerebral hemorrhage.

23
Paul Brickhill, 74, Australian author (The Great Escape, The Dam Busters).
Arthur Derounian, 82,Turkish-American journalist, heart attack.
William Dozier, 83, American film and television producer (Batman, The Green Hornet, Rod Brown of the Rocket Rangers), stroke.
Lokman Hossain Fakir, 56, Bangladeshi musician.
Johnny Thunders, 38, American musician, drug overdose.

24
Mario Acchini, 75, Italian Olympic rower (1948).
Werner Neumann, 86, German musicologist.
Haakon Tranberg, 74, Norwegian sprinter.
Cafer Çağatay, 91-92, Turkish footballer.

25
Lamberto V. Avellana, 76, Filipino film director.
Laz Barrera, 66, Cuban-American racehorse trainer.
Carl Brandt, 76, American composer.
Michael Kühnen, 35, German neo-Nazi leader, AIDS.
Theo Laseroms, 51, Dutch football player, heart attack.
Antônio de Castro Mayer, 86, Brazilian Roman Catholic prelate, respiratory failure.

26
Nate Andrews, 77, American baseball player.
Leo Arnaud, 86, French-American composer.
Gordon Chalk, 77, Australian politician.
Carmine Coppola, 80, American film composer (The Godfather, Apocalypse Now, The Outsiders), Oscar winner (1975), stroke.
Marie-Thérèse d'Alverny, 88, French historian.
A. B. Guthrie Jr., 90, American author.
Lars Hall, 63, Swedish Olympic pentathlete (1952, 1956).
Richard Hatfield, 60, Canadian politician, brain cancer.
Henry Lipson, 81, British physicist, heart attack.
Ezio Marano, 63, Italian actor.
Emily McLaughlin, 62, American actress (General Hospital), cancer.
William Andrew Paton, 101, American accountancy scholar.
Walter Reder, 76, Austrian war criminal (Marzabotto massacre).
Thaddeus Anthony Shubsda, 66, American prelate of the Catholic Church.

27
Georg Ehnes, 70, German politician.
Alfred Eriksen, 72, Norwegian Olympic fencer (1948, 1952).
Pavlos Oikonomou-Gouras, 93, Greek diplomat.
Robert Velter, 82, French cartoonist (Spirou & Fantasio).
Elinor Remick Warren, 91, American composer.

28
Steve Broidy, 85, American film executive, heart attack.
Ken Curtis, 74, American actor (Gunsmoke, The Searchers, Robin Hood) and singer, heart attack.
Jean Goujon, 77, French racing cyclist.
Albrecht Joseph, 89, German playwright, screenwriter and film editor.
Nicola Manzari, 82, Italian filmmaker.
Floyd McKissick, 69, American lawyer and civil rights activist, lung cancer.
Tommy Paul, 82, American boxer.
Pushpavalli, 65, Indian actress, diabetes.
Igal Roodenko, 74, American pacifist and civil rights activist.
Harry Sorensen, 77, American basketball player.
Ollie Spencer, 60, American football player, heart attack.
Stan Turner, 64, English football player.
Willy von Känel, 81, Swiss football player.

29
Claude Gallimard, 77, French publisher.
Gonzaguinha, 45, Brazilian singer, traffic collision.
Joyce Ballou Gregorian, 44, American writer and horse breeder, cancer.
Jackie Searl, 69, American actor.

30
Simon Achikgyozyan, 52, Soviet Armenian soldier and war hero, killed in battle.
André Badonnel, 92, French entomologist.
Ghislaine Dommanget, 90, French-Monegasque royal and actress, princess consort (1946–1949).
Tatul Krpeyan, 26, Soviet Armenian soldier and war hero, shot.
Juozas Urbšys, 95, Lithuanian diplomat.

References 

1991-04
 04